Diagnosis: Murder second season originally aired Fridays at 8:00-9:00 pm (EST).

Cast
Dick Van Dyke as Dr. Mark Sloan
Scott Baio as Dr. Jack Stewart
Victoria Rowell as Dr. Amanda Bentley
Michael Tucci as Norman Briggs
Delores Hall as Delores Mitchell
Barry Van Dyke as Steve Sloan

Episodes

References

Diagnosis: Murder seasons
1994 American television seasons
1995 American television seasons